Lindsay Davenport was the defending champion and successfully defended her title, by defeating Martina Hingis 7–6(9–7), 6–4 in the final.

Seeds
The first four seeds received a bye into the second round.

Draw

Finals

Top half

Bottom half

References

External links
 Official results archive (ITF)
 Official results archive (WTA)

Advanta Championships of Philadelphia
2000 WTA Tour